The 1955 NBA World Championship Series was the championship round of the 1954–55 NBA season. The best-of-seven series was won by the Syracuse Nationals, who defeated the Fort Wayne Pistons in the final game when Syracuse's George King made a free throw with 12 seconds left to put the Nationals up 92–91. King then stole the ball from Fort Wayne's Andy Phillip with three seconds remaining to clinch the victory for Syracuse.  Because of the arena not believing Fort Wayne would make the NBA Finals, the arena was booked and not available, and the Fort Wayne home games were played in Indianapolis.

It has been alleged that some Fort Wayne players conspired with gamblers to throw the series to Syracuse. The suspicious nature of the seventh game in particular has raised concerns about the legitimacy of the series. Fort Wayne led Syracuse 41–24 early in the second quarter, then allowed the Nationals to rally to win the game. Andy Phillip, who turned the ball over with three seconds left in the game, was believed by at least one of his teammates, George Yardley, to have thrown the game. "There were always unwholesome implications about that ball game", Yardley told the author Charley Rosen. However, Phillip may not have acted alone. Other Pistons players were strongly believed to have thrown games during the 1954 and 1955 NBA seasons. In fact, Yardley himself turned the ball over to Syracuse with a palming violation with 18 seconds remaining in Game 7. The foul that gave Syracuse its winning free throw, meanwhile, was committed by Frankie Brian.  The NBA did not return to the 2–3–2 format until 1985. As of the  season, this is the only NBA Finals to date in which the home team has won all seven games.

Series summary

Nationals win series 4–3

 – Games played in Indianapolis

Team rosters

Syracuse Nationals

Fort Wayne Pistons

Notes and sources

See also
1955 NBA Playoffs

External links
NBA History

Finals
National Basketball Association Finals
NBA
NBA
NBA Finals
NBA Finals
Basketball competitions in Indiana
Basketball competitions in Syracuse, New York
NBA Finals
NBA Finals
Sports in Fort Wayne, Indiana